The Topical Group on Shock Compression of Condensed Matter (SHOCK or SCCM) is a Unit of the American Physical Society (APS). The objective of the SCCM is the advancement and dissemination of knowledge on the physics of materials under dynamic high-pressure loading including shock physics, the effect of shock waves on materials, dynamic behavior of materials, and materials in extremes.  Since its formation in 1984, the topical group has sponsored the Biennial International Conference of the APS Topical Group on Shock Compression of Condensed Matter (SCCM) and awards the George E. Duvall Shock Compression Science Award.

While specific topics and session names are set for each Biennial SCCM Conference, frequent topics include:
 Detonation and shock induced chemistry
 Energetic and reactive materials
 Equations of State
 Experimental developments
 First-principles and molecular dynamics
 Geophysics and planetary science
 Grain scale to continuum modeling
 High-energy density physics/Warm dense matter
 Inelastic deformations, fracture, and spall
 Materials Strength
 Particulate, porous, and composite materials
 Phase transitions
 Soft matter, polymers, and biomaterials

Recently one-off focused sessions have been organized on topics such as:
 X-ray free electron lasers and materials, Velocimetry diagnostic development, and Turbulence and Mixing
 Deep Carbon Budget, High Energy Density Materials, and Dynamic Response of Materials
 Post Shock Turbulence, Meso and Macro Scales, and Material Strength at High Pressure

The Topical Group publishes a series of Proceeds from the conferences, with the majority of proceedings published by the American Institute of Physics (1981, 1993 to 2011.)  For the 2013 conference the proceeds was published by the Institute of Physics and was Open Access for the first time.

References

External links
APS Topical Group on Shock Compression of Condensed Matter

American Physical Society